Igor Emilievich Kio (né Igor Emilievich Hirschfeld-Renard) (13 March 1944 – 30 August 2006) was a Russian illusionist with the Russian State Circus (Росгосцирк). Born Igor Emilievich Hirschfeld-Renard, He was the son of the legendary magician Emil Kio (1894-1965). He began to work with his father at age 5, eventually replacing him in the act in 1960. Upon the death of his father in 1965, he inherited the act, which he continued to present in the Soviet Union (and later, Russia) and all over the world well into the 21st century.

In 1962, he was married briefly to Galina Brezhneva, the daughter of Leonid Brezhnev; he was 18 years old, she was 33, and already married. Leonid Brezhnev had the marriage immediately cancelled by the KGB: it had lasted only nine days... In 1966, Igor Kio married circus artist Yolanta Olkhovikova, who came from a famous Russian circus family. They divorced in 1974, and Yolanta married Igor's brother, Emil Kio Jr., himself a famous illusionist. Igor's third wife, whom he married in 1977, was a dancer in his company, Viktoria Ivanovna. Together they had a daughter, also named Viktoria.

In addition to his work in the circus ring, Kio often performed on television, including an annual New Year's Day program in the 1980s. He also appeared on television as a presenter, and was featured in a Soviet film, Девочка на шаре ("The Girl On The Rolling Globe") in 1966. Igor Kio was a major star of Russian entertainment — not in the least for his tumultuous private life.

Igor Kio was a member of the International Brotherhood of Magicians, and won numerous international awards for his work as a magician. He had been awarded the title of People's Artist of the Soviet Russian Federative Republic by the Soviet Government in 1980. He had published his memoirs in 1999, titled Иллюзии без иллюзий ("Illusions without illusions").  Igor died in August 2006 at age 62.

References

 Igor Kio, Иллюзии без иллюзий (Moscow, ВАГРИУС, 1999)

1944 births
2006 deaths
Burials at Novodevichy Cemetery
Russian magicians
Soviet magicians